Terence "Terry" O'Dea (3 May 1945 – 18 May 2021) was an Australian professional darts player who competed in the 1970s and 1980s.

Darts career
O'Dea joined the BDO in March 1978.

O'Dea played in ten successive BDO World Darts Championships with his best run coming in 1982 and 1986 where he reached the quarter-finals. O'Dea also played in four World Masters tournaments, reaching the quarter-finals in 1984.

He appeared on the UK television show Bullseye presented by Jim Bowen in 1984 where he scored 300 points (in 9 darts) for charity. He appeared two years later and scored 305.

O'Dea quit the BDO in 1988.

World Championship results

BDO

 1979: 2nd Round (lost to Eric Bristow 0–2) (sets) 
 1980: 2nd Round (lost to Tony Brown 0–2)
 1981: 1st Round (lost to Eric Bristow 0–2)
 1982: Quarter Finals (lost to John Lowe 1–4)
 1983: 2nd Round (lost to John Lowe 2–3)
 1984: 1st Round (lost to Jocky Wilson 0–2)
 1985: 1st Round (lost to John Lowe 1–2)
 1986: Quarter Finals (lost to Alan Glazier 3–4)
 1987: 1st Round (lost to Rick Ney 1–3)
 1988: 1st Round (lost to Jocky Wilson 1–3)

References

External links
 Terry O'Dea's Stats and Profile on Darts Database

1945 births
2021 deaths
Australian darts players
British Darts Organisation players
Sportspeople from Perth, Western Australia